Stuart E. Jones (born 1959) is an American diplomat. He previously served as the United States Ambassador to Iraq from 2014 to 2016, and as the United States Ambassador to Jordan from July 21, 2011, to July 28, 2014.

Biography
Stuart E. Jones graduated from Duke University and received a J.D. from the University of Pennsylvania Law School.

He joined the United States Foreign Service as a career diplomat. He served as Governorate Coordinator in Al Anbar Province in Iraq, and at the National Security Council as Country Director for Iraq. From 1994 to 1996, he was special assistant to the U.S. Permanent Representative to the United Nations. He has also served in Turkey, El Salvador and Colombia.

From 2005 to 2008, he served as Deputy Chief of Mission at the American Embassy in Cairo, Egypt. From 2008 to 2010, he served as Deputy Assistant Secretary of State at the State Department's Bureau of European and Eurasian Affairs. He also served as Deputy Chief of Mission at the American Embassy in Baghdad.

On July 21, 2011, he was appointed United States Ambassador to Jordan.

On May 8, 2014, President Obama nominated Jones to be the United States Ambassador to Iraq.  On June 26, 2014, the U.S. Senate confirmed Jones in a 93–0 vote. He was sworn in by United States Secretary of State John Kerry on September 17, 2014.

As of 2018, he works at Bechtel Engineering.

References

External links

|-

Ambassadors of the United States to Iraq
Ambassadors of the United States to Jordan
Duke University alumni
Living people
University of Pennsylvania Law School alumni
1959 births
United States Foreign Service personnel